A network address is an identifier for a node or host on a telecommunications network. Network addresses are designed to be unique identifiers across the network, although some networks allow for local, private addresses, or locally administered addresses that may not be unique. Special network addresses are allocated as broadcast or multicast addresses. These too are not unique.

In some cases, network hosts may have more than one network address. For example, each network interface controller may be uniquely identified. Further, because protocols are frequently layered, more than one protocol's network address can occur in any particular network interface or node and more than one type of network address may be used in any one network.

Network addresses can be flat addresses which contain no information about the node's location in the network (such as a MAC address), or may contain structure or hierarchical information for the routing (such as an IP address).

Examples 
Examples of network addresses include:
 Telephone number, in the public switched telephone network
 IP address in IP networks including the Internet
 IPX address, in NetWare
 X.25 or X.21 address, in a circuit switched data network 
 MAC address, in Ethernet and other related IEEE 802 network technologies

See also
 IP address

References

External links

Telecommunications engineering